Charles Mason (November 29, 1894 – October 29, 1974) was an American Negro league outfielder in the 1920s and 1930s. 

A native of Birmingham, Alabama, Mason made his Negro leagues debut in 1922 with the Richmond Giants and Bacharach Giants. He continued with the Bacharach club into 1925, and from 1925 to 1928 was with the Lincoln Giants. Mason also played for the Newark Stars in their lone season, 1926. He finished his career in 1932 with the Washington Pilots.

References

External links
 and Baseball-Reference Black Baseball stats and Seamheads

1894 births
1974 deaths
Bacharach Giants players
Baltimore Black Sox players
Cuban House of David players
Homestead Grays players
Lincoln Giants players
Newark Stars players
Pollock's Cuban Stars players
Richmond Giants players
Washington Pilots players
Baseball outfielders
Baseball players from Birmingham, Alabama